"Let's Kiss (Like Angels Do)" is a song by Australian recording artist Wendy Matthews. It was released in April 1992 as the third and final single form Matthew's debut solo studio album, Émigré. The song peaked at number 14 on the ARIA Charts.

At the ARIA Music Awards of 1992, it earned Matthews a nomination for Best Female Artist.

Track listings
CD single/ 7" single
 "Let's Kiss (Like Angels Do)"	
 "I See the Light" 

CD Maxi / 12" single
 "Let's Kiss (Like Angels Do)" (Heavenly Mix) - 5:50
 "I See the Light" 
 "Let's Kiss (Like Angels Do)"		
 "Woman's Gotta Have It" (Acoustic)

Charts

References

Songs about kissing
1991 singles
1990 songs
Wendy Matthews songs